Events from the year 1936 in Croatia.

Incumbents

Events

Arts and literature

Sport

Births
February 17 – Stipe Šuvar, sociologist and politician (died 2004)
April 8 – Milivoj Solar, literary critic
April 29 – Miroslav Šutej, painter (died 2005)
 March 9 – Dina Merhav, sculptor (died 2022)
July 8 – Gabi Novak, singer
August 3 – Vice Vukov, singer and politician (died 2008)
November 18 – Ante Žanetić, footballer

Deaths
September 15 – Svetozar Pribićević, ethnic Serb politician (born 1875)
December 18 – Andrija Mohorovičić, meteorologist and seismologist (born 1857)
December 24 – Dragutin Gorjanović-Kramberger, paleontologist (born 1856)

References

 
Years of the 20th century in Croatia
Croatia